James Wemyss, Lord Burntisland (bef. 1657 – December 1682) was a Scottish peer.

Weymss was the son of General Sir James Wemyss of Caskieberry. On 28 March 1672, he married his cousin, Lady Margaret Wemyss and they later had three surviving children:

Lady Anna (18 October 1675 – 1702), married David Melville, 3rd Earl of Leven.
Lady Margaret (1 April 1677 – 29 March 1763), married David Carnegie, 4th Earl of Northesk.
David, later 4th Earl of Wemyss (1678–1720).

Almost a month after his marriage, Wemyss was created Lord Burntisland for life and died in 1682.

References

1682 deaths
Year of birth uncertain
17th-century Scottish peers
Life peers created by Charles II
Members of the Parliament of Scotland 1669–1674
Members of the Convention of the Estates of Scotland 1678
Members of the Parliament of Scotland 1681–1682